Mickey Mouse: Magic Wands!, known in Japan as  and known in Europe as Mickey Mouse V: Magic Wands!, is a puzzle/action game hybrid developed and published by Kemco in Japan on December 22, 1993. It was later published in North America and Europe by Nintendo in May 1998 in a version featuring the Super Game Boy support. It is the fifth installment in the Crazy Castle series. 

It was the last of Kemco's Mickey Mouse-based video games in their Crazy Castle series and the only title to be released in North America under its original title (although the Roman numeral was removed).

Gameplay
To save his friends, Mickey has to collect puzzle pieces that completes images of his Disney friends, including Minnie Mouse, Donald Duck, Goofy and even obscure characters like Grandma Duck from the comic book series. To do this, Mickey has to wave his wand over crystals which conceal not only pieces of the image, but also items and even an occasional enemy. Each big level has ten small stages, each with at least one image to complete. Each tenth stage has an end boss to defeat. The image to complete in the tenth stage of each level reveals the Disney character being held captive by the end boss of that level.

Plot
One day, Mickey and his friends went for a walk in a forest. They became so distracted by all the natural beauty surrounding them, they got lost. Pretty soon, they discovered a haunted castle that belongs to the evil witch Yashja. The castle is full of tricks and traps and even magic wands to create ice and fire. Suddenly, a gaping hole opened up under Mickey's friends and they all fell in. Now Mickey has to save his friends, who are now being held captive by the witch.

In the ending, Mickey runs to the center of a long room and calls out for Minnie, who eventually answers. They meet and embrace each other. Then they go meet their Disney friends. Everyone says it is good they could return. Minnie thanks Mickey for saving her and the rest of their friends. Goofy then decides to take a picture of all the friends. After the picture snaps, the Disney characters are seen together in a big portrait.

See also
 List of Disney video games

External links
 

1993 video games
Kemco games
Game Boy-only games
Mickey Mouse video games
Nintendo games
Video games developed in Japan
Video games about witchcraft
Game Boy games
Single-player video games